Christian Terence Hyslop (born 14 June 1972) is a former professional footballer who played in the Football League as a full back.

Career
Born in Watford, Hyslop began his career at Southend United, where he made 19 appearances, and during this stint had a loan spell at Northampton Town, making eight league appearances. He moved to Colchester United in 1994 where he made eight appearances. He also played in non-league football for Hendon, Chelmsford City, Billericay Town, Baldock Town and Harrow Borough, as well as overseas in Australia and in the Republic of Ireland for Waterford. In the 2010–11 season, he was the Fitness Coach at Leyton Orient.

Honours

Club
Southend United
 Football League Third Division Runner-up (1): 1990–91

References

External links 
Chris Hyslop Career Stats at Neil Brown's
Player Profile - Christian Hyslop

1972 births
People from Watford
Colchester United F.C. players
Southend United F.C. players
Northampton Town F.C. players
Hendon F.C. players
Chelmsford City F.C. players
Billericay Town F.C. players
Baldock Town F.C. players
Harrow Borough F.C. players
Waterford F.C. players
Living people
English footballers
English expatriate footballers
English expatriate sportspeople in Ireland
English expatriate sportspeople in Australia
Expatriate association footballers in the Republic of Ireland
Expatriate soccer players in Australia
English Football League players
Association football fullbacks
League of Ireland players
Leyton Orient F.C. non-playing staff
Association football coaches